Burley is an unincorporated community and census-designated place (CDP) in Kitsap County, Washington, United States. It is located just north of the boundary with Pierce County, about halfway between Gig Harbor to the south and Port Orchard to the north. It is located at the head of the Burley Lagoon in Henderson Bay. Burley is a residential area. The community's population stood at 2,057 at the 2010 census.

History
Burley was established in 1898 as a cooperative socialist colony by a group called the Co-operative Brotherhood, an offshoot of the Brotherhood of the Co-operative Commonwealth that had established Equality Colony elsewhere in Washington state in the previous year. Both communities were part of an attempt to plant socialist colonies in Washington in order to convert first the state, and then the entire nation, to socialism.

Burley was originally named "Brotherhood". Circle City was an area of the colony with buildings laid out on the periphery of a circle. In its earliest years the community achieved a maximum population of approximately 150, but like some other planned towns of the era such as Equality Colony, its population endured a long decline through the ensuing years. The local economy was dominated by the lumber industry; other businesses never flourished, though a cigar-manufacturing effort did achieve some short-term success.

Geography
Burley is in southern Kitsap County. It is bordered to the south by the Pierce County communities of Wauna and Purdy. Washington State Route 16 passes through the eastern side of Burley, leading north  to Port Orchard and south  to Gig Harbor.

See also
 Social Democracy of America
 Socialist Party of Washington

References

External links
 Description of Burley in the old days

Census-designated places in Washington (state)
Census-designated places in Kitsap County, Washington
Populated places established in 1898
Utopian communities in Washington